Stainforth Bridge, (also known as Stainforth packhorse bridge and Knight Stainforth bridge) is a 17th century, arched packhorse bridge over the River Ribble in Stainforth, North Yorkshire, England. The bridge was formerly on the main packhorse road between York and Lancaster, which has been superseded by later roads. It was in private ownership until the 1930s, when it was taken on by the National Trust. It is now a grade II listed structure and provides access to Stainforth Force, which is just below the bridge.

History
The bridge was built by Samuel Watson , a local Quaker who owned Knight Stainforth Hall, a Jacobean house which was nearby. Previous to this, the site was a ford which was impassable during times of flood, and a local legend suggests that the crossing was used by the Romans. The bridge carries a minor road, Dog Hill Brow, over the river connecting Knight and Little Stainforth. Besides being a Medieval road linking York and Lancaster, and a monastic route taken by monks between their houses in Yorkshire and the Lake District, the route was also a packhorse road connecting Clapham with Malham. A covenant was drawn up in the year of the bridge's building stating that people on foot, or with carts and cattle, had "free passage between the towns of Knight Stainforth and Stainforth Under Bargh." The bridge was built by using tradesmen from Stainforth-under-Bargh (now the main village of Stainforth), and in return, the people of Stainforth were afforded full usage rights, as the bridge was also a necessity locally.

At its widest point, it reaches .

On 23 September 1931, the bridge went from private ownership into the National Trust, helped by an endowment by the previous owners. Doubts had been expressed about the structure after heavy motor vehicles had been using it, causing the bridge to be weakened. It was thought that the National Trust could enforce restrictions on heavy goods vehicles more effectively than private owners.

The bridge was registered in 1988 by Historic England as a Grade II listed structure under the name of Knight Stainforth Bridge.

Notes

References

Sources

Bridges across the River Ribble
Stone bridges in England
Road bridges in England
Grade II listed bridges
1675 establishments in England
Ribblesdale